Thone may refer to one of the following.

 Thone River in New South Wales, Australia
 Mount Thone, today Tuna el-Gebel

People with the surname
 Charles Thone (1924-2018), American politician
 Wilhelm Thöne (1893–1974), German World War I flying ace

See also 

 Thônes, a commune in Haute-Savoie department, Rhône-Alpes region, France
 Thoen (disambiguation)
 Thony (name)
 Tone (disambiguation)